The 2019 BoyleSports Grand Slam of Darts was the thirteenth staging of the tournament, organised by the Professional Darts Corporation. The event took place from 9–17 November 2019 in Wolverhampton, England, and like in 2018, it took place at Aldersley Leisure Village.

The tournament's defending champion was Gerwyn Price, who won his first PDC major title by defeating Gary Anderson 16–13, in a highly controversial final in 2018. Price successfully defended the title to win his second PDC major, beating Peter Wright 16–6 with the second highest average in a Grand Slam final.

Prize money
The prize fund for the Grand Slam increased from £450,000 in 2018 to £550,000 this year, with the winner getting £125,000.

Qualifying

PDC Qualifying Tournaments

At most sixteen players could qualify through this method, where the position in the list depicts the priority of the qualification.

As the list of qualifiers from the main tournaments produced fewer than sixteen players, the field of sixteen players is filled from the reserve lists. The first list consists of the winners from 2019 European Tour events, in which the winners are ordered by number of event wins then in Order of Merit position order at the cut-off date.

If there were still less than sixteen qualified players after the winners of European Tour events are added, then the winners of 2019 Players Championships events would have been added, firstly by winners of multiple events followed by Order of Merit order, but that was not needed for this year's competition.

PDC Qualifying Event
A further eight places in the Grand Slam of Darts were filled by qualifiers from a PDC qualifier in Wigan on 4 November. These are the qualifiers:
 Gabriel Clemens
 Ryan Harrington
 Robert Thornton
 Brendan Dolan
 Jamie Hughes
 Darren Webster
 Ross Smith
 Adrian Lewis

BDO Qualifying Tournaments
The men's and women's champions from the 2019 BDO World Darts Championship were invited, as was the winner of the 2019 BDO World Trophy.

BDO Ranking qualifiers
The top ranked male and female players were invited.
 Wesley Harms
 Lisa Ashton

Three more invitations were given to the next highest ranked men's players:
  Richard Veenstra
  Dave Parletti
  Wayne Warren

Pools

Draw

Group stage
All group matches are best of nine legs  After three games, the top two in each group qualify for the knock-out stage

NB: P = Played; W = Won; L = Lost; LF = Legs for; LA = Legs against; +/− = Plus/minus record, in relation to legs; Pts = Points; Status = Qualified to knockout stage

Group A

9 November

10 November

12 November

Group B

9 November

10 November

12 November

Group C

9 November

10 November

12 November

Group D

9 November

10 November

12 November

Group E

9 November

10 November

11 November

Group F

9 November

10 November

11 November

Group G

9 November

10 November

11 November

Group H

9 November

10 November

11 November

Knockout stage

References

2019
Grand Slam
Grand Slam of Darts
Grand Slam of Darts